Sarganidae is an extinct family of Cretaceous-aged predatory sea snails, marine gastropod mollusks in the clade Neogastropoda.

References

Prehistoric gastropods